Apocorophium lacustre is a species of amphipod crustacean. It lives in nearly fresh water; it is white and up to 6 mm long. It occurs mainly on the Atlantic coast of North America, the North Sea and the Baltic.

References

Corophiidea
Crustaceans of the Atlantic Ocean
Crustaceans described in 1911